Erechthias chionodira is a species of moth in the family Tineidae. It was described by Edward Meyrick in 1880 using two specimens obtained in Auckland on a shady bank amongst forest in January. This species is endemic to New Zealand.

References

External links

Type specimen of species.

Erechthiinae
Moths of New Zealand
Moths described in 1880
Endemic fauna of New Zealand
Taxa named by Edward Meyrick
Endemic moths of New Zealand